Tobias Andreae, who was born at Frankfurt-am-Main in 1823, studied under J. Becker, and then went to Munich, where he made the acquaintance of Carl Rahl and Bonaventura Genelli. In 1853 he visited Italy, and painted landscapes, into which he occasionally introduced moonlight effects. Andreae died at Munich in 1873.

See also
 List of German painters

References 
 

1823 births
1873 deaths
19th-century German painters
19th-century German male artists
German male painters
Artists from Frankfurt